is a Japanese professional footballer who currently plays for Omiya Ardija.

Career

Honda FC
Kurimoto was named Japan Football League MVP for two consecutive seasons in 2016 and 2017.

References

1990 births
Living people
Association football midfielders
Japanese footballers
Japanese expatriate footballers
Honda FC players
Fresno FC players
Colorado Springs Switchbacks FC players
OKC Energy FC players
USL Championship players
Japanese expatriate sportspeople in the United States
Juntendo University alumni

Omiya Ardija players